Vágar Airport  is the only airport in the Faroe Islands, and is located  east of the village of Sørvágur, on the island of Vágar. Due to the Faroe Islands' status as a self-governing territory, the airport is not subject to the rules of the European Union. It is the main operating base for Faroese national airline Atlantic Airways and, for a brief period during 2006, was also the base for the low-cost airline FaroeJet.

History

Early years
The airport was built by British Army Royal Engineers during World War II on the island of Vágar; the site was known as RAF Vagar/Vaagar (Royal Air Force). The site was chosen mainly because it was hard to see from the surrounding waters and any potential German warship. The first aeroplane landed here in Autumn 1942. (See British occupation of the Faroe Islands in World War II). British engineers had similarly first built Reykjavík Airport in Iceland in 1940, then known as RAF Reykjavik, following the British Occupation of Iceland.

After the war, Vágar airfield was abandoned and left unused until 1963, when it was reopened as a civilian airport at the initiative of two Sørvágur residents, Hugo Fjørðoy and Lars Larsen. The two worked with the Icelandic airline Icelandair, which began the scheduled flights to Bergen, Copenhagen and Glasgow using a Douglas DC-3 aircraft. In 1964 a separate airline, Faroe Airways, operated flights, first using chartered aircraft but in 1965 they bought a DC-3 from the Swedish airline Linjeflyg. The company ceased operating on 28 September 1967. In 1971, Icelandair was operating Boeing 727-100 jetliners into the airport with weekly nonstop service to Glasgow and Reykjavik.  In 1988, Atlantic Airways was flying British Aerospace BAe 146-200 jet service nonstop to Copenhagen.  Until 2004 Maersk Air also operated flights into the airport.  Maersk Air flew Boeing 737-500 jetliners into the airport with service to Copenhagen.

Development since the 2000s
Until 2002 travel from the airport to most locations in the Faroe Islands including the capital Tórshavn required a car ferry, but since the Vágatunnilin, a tolled road tunnel, was opened in 2002, travel has been made much easier by giving direct road access to the neighbouring island of Streymoy, where Tórshavn is located.

A new airport terminal opened on 17 June 2014 with increased passenger capacity.

Construction work started in May 2010, and on 3 December 2011, the extended runway was opened and put into use for the first time. Previously,  jet aircraft with short airfield performance such as the British Aerospace BAe 146 (which ceased to be produced 2001) were preferred for use into the airport (although Maersk Air operated flights with Boeing 737-500 aircraft), and then the most distant destination was Copenhagen, . The Airbus A319 of Atlantic Airways is able to utilise the extended runway, and services with this type with Atlantic Airways began in March 2012. Tourist summer flights to Barcelona and Milan were introduced. However, in 2014 they decided to stop the routes to Milan and to London. Instead, they chose to fly to Mallorca and to Aberdeen, later changed to Edinburgh, and in 2017 to Gran Canaria.

On 26 March 2016, Scandinavian Airlines (SAS) began to fly from Copenhagen to Vágar, the first airline other than Atlantic to do so in many years. SAS has had trouble with fog landings which caused cancellations. But in February 2019 SAS started using the Required Navigation Performance procedure, which allows landings in more fog, but requires special onboard equipment, pilot training and approval from the aviation administration. Atlantic Airways began using the system in 2012 as first airline in Europe.

The airport is currently managed by the Danish Transport Authority, although the ownership of the airport was handed over to the Faroese government in May 2007.

Airlines and destinations

The airlines in the table below offer regular passenger scheduled and seasonal flights at Vágar Airport.

There are occasional public charter flights operated by major European airlines, e.g. Wizzair and Austrian Airlines, for example for supporters to football qualification matches. There are also fairly frequent corporate charter flights (seats not available to public) done by e.g. Widerøe. The extended runway and better instrument landing system has made it easier for airlines other than Atlantic Airways to land at Vágar.

Ground transport
There are bus services about 10 times each direction per day between the airport and Tórshavn. They take one hour. The "Vágatunnilin" tunnel connects the airport and the Vágar island to the main towns and villages in the Faroe Islands.

Statistics

Accidents and incidents
26 September 1970: a Fokker F27 Friendship, with registration TF-FIL, from Flugfélag Íslands on flight from Bergen to Vágar Airport, crashed in bad weather on Mykines. The captain and 7 passengers, all seated on the left side of the plane, were killed. 26 passengers and crew survived, some with serious injuries. Three passengers hiked for an hour to reach Mykines village to alert the authorities. Most of the villagers went up the mountain to aid the survivors before the arrival of the Danish patrol vessel F348 Hvidbjørnen. A marble memorial was placed in the church.
25 January 1975: a Fokker F27 aircraft registered as OY-APB attempted to land on a wet and icy runway. Without having been informed of the conditions, the pilots veered the aircraft off the runway and collided with terrain.
6 July 1987: a Partenavia P.68 aircraft registered as G-SPOT, operated by Octavia Air, crashed on approach to Vágar Airport in poor weather conditions and limited visibility. The aircraft struck a rocky face (150 metres high) located 15 km southwest from the airport. All three occupants were killed.
3 August 1996: a Gulfstream III of the Danish Air Force crashed during final approach to Vágar Airport in bad weather and poor visibility. Extreme atmospheric turbulences caused the pilots to lose control; the aircraft suddenly rolled 180 degrees and crashed on the slope of a mountain located 2 km short of runway (near Selvík stream, west of Sørvágur ). Nine people, including the Danish Chief of Defence Jørgen Garde and his wife, perished as the aircraft collided with high terrain surrounding the airport.

See also
List of airports in the Faroe Islands
List of the largest airports in the Nordic countries

References

External links

Official website

 

Airports in the Faroe Islands
Vágar
Airports established in 1942
1942 establishments in the Faroe Islands
Civilian airports with RAF origins
International airports in Denmark